Munna Kasi, also known as Venkata Surya Narayana Murthy Kasi, is an Indian film music composer.

Early life and education 
Munna Kasi was born in Visakhapatnam. He completed his school education, college and graduation in Narsipatnam and pursued his MBA from Dr N.S. Kolla School of Business, Visakhapatnam. He is an accomplished MBA gold medalist

Career 
Munna Kasi shared a strong passion for music right from childhood. He considers himself  a diehard fan of Ilayaraja and was inspired by his compositions, right from a very young age.
After completion of MBA in 2007, he left to Dubai where he worked as a radio jockey and music composer for international jingles in Dubai radio station.  Realizing that his passion was to make music, he quit his job and pursued his passion. An accomplished keyboard player, he offered live music for plays in Andhra University, Vizag.

After working for Abheera for Maa TV in 2011, he has also created fusion albums along with playback singer Sai Shivani in the same year. After composing tunes for Mr. 7, his debut project, producer Anil Sunkara gave him an opportunity in his film Action 3D.

He has also penned a song ‘Neelone e Kalaham’ along with late Uday Kiran for his last film Chitram Cheppina Katha. Munna Kasi also rendered his voice for a song 'Udayinche Kiranamla' in this film, as a tribute for Uday Kiran. When Ram Gopal Varma’s landmark film Shiva released in 1989, Munna Kasi says he was only a kid, but he became a big fan of RGV and music director Ilayaraja, when he finally watched the film after completing his schooling. Munna Kasi’s dream came true when Ram Gopal Varma selected him for Spot and he has also teamed up with Ramu for films like Sridevi and Attack.

Munna Kasi made his directorial debut with a Musical Horror Movie Heza and the movie is released on 12 th December 2019.

Filmography

References

External links 
 https://www.facebook.com/munnakasi?fref=photo
 https://web.archive.org/web/20151117023533/http://movies.dosthana.com/profile/munna-kasi

Musicians from Visakhapatnam
Telugu people
Telugu film score composers
Tamil film score composers
1985 births
Living people
Film musicians from Andhra Pradesh
21st-century Indian composers